The Waikato region of the North Island of New Zealand contains numerous small rural primary schools, some small town primary and secondary schools, and city schools in Hamilton.

Schools in the Waitomo District and Taupo Districts that are located in other regions (namely Manawatu-Wanganui, Hawke's Bay and Bay of Plenty) are listed here. Schools in the Rotorua District that are located in the Waikato region are listed at list of schools in the Bay of Plenty Region.

In New Zealand schools, students begin formal education in Year 1 at the age of five. Year 13 is the final year of secondary education. Years 14 and 15 refer to adult education facilities.

State schools are those fully funded by the government and at which no fees for tuition of domestic students (i.e. New Zealand citizens and permanent residents, and Australian citizens) can be charged, although a donation is commonly requested. A state integrated school is a former private school with a special character based on a religious or philosophical belief that has been integrated into the state system. State integrated schools charge "attendance dues" to cover the building and maintenance of school buildings, which are not owned by the government, but otherwise they like state schools cannot charge fees for tuition of domestic students but may request a donation. Private schools charge fees to its students for tuition, as do state and state integrated schools for tuition of international students.

The socioeconomic decile indicates the socioeconomic status of the school's catchment area. A decile of 1 indicates the school draws from a poor area; a decile of 10 indicates the school draws from a well-off area. The decile ratings used here come from the Ministry of Education Te Kete Ipurangi website and from the decile change spreadsheet listed in the references. The deciles of all schools were last revised using information from the 2006 Census, and may occasionally change for some schools between Censuses as schools open, close and merge. The roll of each school changes frequently as students start school for the first time, move between schools, and graduate. The rolls given here are those provided by the Ministry of Education are based on figures from November 2012. The Ministry of Education institution number links to the Education Counts page for each school.

Thames-Coromandel District

Former schools
The Coromandel Learning Centre was a private coeducational primary school for years 1–8, in Coromandel.
Coromandel Rudolf Steiner School was a small private full primary (years 1-8) school. It closed at the end of 2007.
Kauaeranga Valley School flourished between 1903 and 1933.

Hauraki District

Waikato District

Matamata-Piako District

Hamilton City

Primary and intermediate schools

Secondary and composite schools

Special schools

Waipa District

The Church College of New Zealand closed in 2009.

Ōtorohanga District

South Waikato District

Waitomo District

Taupo District

Notes

References
Te Kete Ipurangi Ministry of Education website
ERO school and early childhood education reports Education Review Office
Decile change 2007 to 2008 for state & state integrated schools

Schools
Waikato